The Jamestown Sun is a daily newspaper printed in Jamestown, North Dakota.  The Sun is the official newspaper of Stutsman County, North Dakota and has a modest circulation in southeast North Dakota.

History
Percy Hansen and Bryon Hansen bought the Jamestown Alert in 1925 from William Kellogg.  The Alert'''s history dated back to July 1878, and Kellogg had been the owner since 1886.  The Hansens renamed it the Jamestown Sun'', and Byron served as publisher.  In 1988, Byron's son Gordon (who had taken over as publisher) sold the paper to the American Publishing Company (later Hollinger International); they sold it in 2000 to the current owner, Forum Communications.  The paper moved from evening publication to a morning edition in 1992.

References

External links
Jamestown Sun website

Newspapers published in North Dakota
Jamestown, North Dakota
Forum Communications Company